Kedumim, is an Israeli settlement organized as a local council located in the northern West Bank. Founded on Hanukkah 1975 by members of the Gush Emunim settlement movement, it later became a local council.

The consensus of the international community considers Israeli settlements in the West Bank illegal under international law. According to the BBC, as of 2008 "every government in the world, except Israel, considered the settlements to be illegal". The Israeli government, dispute this.

History

According to ARIJ, Israel had between 1967 and 1993 confiscated land from three Palestinian villages to construct the various parts of the illegal settlement of Kedumim:

 231 dunams from Kafr Qaddum,
 163 dunams from Immatain, and
 13 dunams from Jit.

In late 1974, a group affiliated with Gush Emunim named Garin Elon Moreh, led by Rabbi Menachem Felix and Benny Katzover, attempted to establish a settlement on the ruins of the Sebastia train station dating from the Ottoman period. An Israeli cabinet resolution, passed 17–2 with 3 abstentions, found the settlement illegal in 1975. After several attempts to remove residents from the site by the Israel Defense Forces, an agreement was reached in which 25 families were permitted to settle in Kadum, an army camp southwest of Nablus. The small mobile home site developed into the town of Kedumim. The Sebastia agreement was a turning point that opened up the northern West Bank to Jewish settlement.

From 1977 on, the government of Menachim Begin strongly backed settlement at Kedumim. Begin visited on 19 May and declared "We stand on the land of liberated Israel." In July, his government granted full legal status to Kedumim (then numbering around 100 settlers), Ofra, and Maaleh Adumim.

Several residents of Kedumim have been killed in Palestinian political violence. Rabbi Binyamin Herling (64), a Holocaust survivor, was killed at Mount Ebal by Palestinian security forces and Fatah members who opened fire on a group of men, women, and children. The Kedumim bombing, on May 30, 2006, occurred when a suicide bomber disguised as an Orthodox Jewish hitchhiker blew himself up inside a car that stopped to pick him up near the gas station at the entrance to the village. The blast killed four Israelis: Rafi Halevy (63), Helena Halevy (58), Re'ut Feldman (20), and Shaked Lasker (16). Al-Aqsa Martyrs Brigades claimed responsibility. On November 19, 2007, Ido Zoldan (29) was killed in a shooting attack near Kedumim when Palestinian militants opened fire on his car.

Local Council
When Shomron Regional Council was established, Kedumim was one of its villages. In 1992, as the population in Kedumim was over 3,000, a Local Council was established with a mayor from outside – Yosef Kapakh. In 1996 were the first elections, and Danielle Weiss was elected, the first woman in this job in Israel. After two terms in office, in 2007, Hananel Dorani was elected. Dorani is a vice-Brigade commander in reserve in the IDF, living in the village from 1992 after marrying one of its residents. In 2013 Local Elections in Israel, Dorani kept his job after none was against him. In 2018 Local Elections in Israel, Dorani won Roee Massuri and kept his job for the third time.

Education
The residents of Kedumim have placed an emphasis on education and developed several local institutions, including: day care centers, kindergartens, two elementary schools, the Bnei Chayil Yeshiva, the Har Efrayim Yeshiva, the Lehava Ulpana High School (1,000 girls), as well as a local music academy, and a public library.

Yeshivat Bnei Chayil Shomron is a high school yeshiva established in 1998 to provide an Orthodox Jewish education for boys with ADD and ADHD. It is considered a unique facility in central Israel not limited to local students. Students in grades 7–12 are divided into classes which are limited to a maximum of fifteen boys. The school in Kedumim was originally a branch of a Jerusalem school of the same name founded by Dr. Stuart Chesner.

Economy 
While many residents work outside the settlement, many are employed locally in education, as well as several agricultural enterprises working with greenhouses and orchards. The Bar-On Industrial Park on 1,200 dunums (120 hectares, 297 acres) of land is within the municipal boundaries of Kedumim. Kedumim 3000, operated by Nahman Zoldan, is a construction firm headquartered in the settlement. The firm has worked on construction projects throughout the West Bank and East Jerusalem.

Status under international law
The international community considers Israeli settlements a violation of the Fourth Geneva Convention. Israel disputes that the Fourth Geneva Convention applies to these territories as they had not been legally held by a sovereign prior to Israel taking control of them. This view has been rejected by the International Court of Justice, International Committee of the Red Cross and repeatedly by the UN Security Council.

According to B'Tselem, portions of Kedumim were built on privately owned Palestinian land. There are additionally two Israeli outposts adjacent to Kedumim, one of which is also built on privately owned Palestinian land.

Notable Residents
Daniella Weiss
Bezalel Smotrich

See also
Kedumim bombing

References

External links

Bnei Chayil Yeshiva
Kedumim(3000)

Israeli settlements in the West Bank
Mixed Israeli settlements
Local councils in Israel
Populated places established in 1975
1975 establishments in the Israeli Military Governorate